Zhou Yajun (born October 17, 1984 in Shanghai) is a Chinese association football goalkeeper who currently plays for Shenzhen FC.

Club career

Shenhua and University
Zhou Yajun began his football career with the various Shanghai Shenhua youth teams and took part in the squads that trained in Brazil, however instead of immediately continuing with his football career Zhou Yajun would instead continue with his studies and go to Donghua University where he still played football as a goalkeeper. Once he had completed his studies he was allowed to return to Shanghai Shenhua and by the 2006 Chinese Super League season he would start his professional football career as their third choice goalkeeper. His league debut would come on July 16, 2006 against Qingdao Zhongneng in a 2-0 win. Surprisingly he would find himself continuing to play in goal due to injury and suspensions to the other goalkeepers and by the end of the season he had played in 12 league games. Zhou Yajun's progression within the Shanghai Shenhua's football team was short lived when they merged with local football team Shanghai United F.C. and with the influx of players he found himself immediately dropped from the newly formed team throughout the 2007 league season.

Henan Construction
Zhou Yajun was surplus to requirements and was allowed to leave Shanghai Shenhua at the end of the 2007 league season and by the beginning of the 2008 Chinese Super League season he joined Henan Construction. He would make his debut on their first game of the season on April 5, 2008 against Liaoning Whowin F.C. in a 3-3 draw. After that game he would become their first choice goalkeeper throughout the season. While he aided Henan to a respectable 10th within the league he was dropped in favour of new goalkeeper Zeng Cheng by new Manager Tang Yaodong at the beginning of the 2009 Chinese Super League.

Shenzhen
On 3 February 2016, Zhou signed for China League One club  Shenzhen FC. He would make his debut in a league game on 12 March 2016 against Xinjiang Tianshan Leopard F.C. in a 2-1 victory. He would go on to be part of the squad that gained promotion at the end of the 2018 China League One campaign.

Career statistics 
Statistics accurate as of match played 31 December 2019.

Honours

Club
Henan Construction
China League One: 2013

References

External links
 Player stats at sohu.com
 Squad profile at Henan Construction website
 

1984 births
Living people
Association football goalkeepers
Chinese footballers
Footballers from Shanghai
Shanghai Shenhua F.C. players
Henan Songshan Longmen F.C. players
Shenzhen F.C. players
Chinese Super League players
China League One players
Donghua University alumni